Kaskas may refer to:

Kaska Dena, a North American First Nations people
Kaskians, a Bronze Age people also called Kaska
Poppy seeds, also called kas-kas
Qashqai people, a primarily Turkic people in Iran
Saki Kaskas (1971-2016), a Greek-Canadian music producer.

See also

Gas Gas, a Spanish motorcycle manufacturer
 Kaskian (disambiguation)
Kaskaskia (disambiguation)
Kaska (disambiguation)
Kas (disambiguation)
Cassiar (disambiguation), a term derived from Kaskas